Zasole  is a village in the administrative district of Gmina Brzeszcze, within Oświęcim County, Lesser Poland Voivodeship, in southern Poland.

The village has a population of 800.

References

Zasole